Anticlinura serilla is a species of sea snail, a marine gastropod mollusk in the family Mangeliidae.

Description
The length of the shell attains 8.3 mm, its diameter 4 mm.

(Original description) The small, fusiform shell is sharply sculptured. Its color is white with an olivaceous periostracum. it contains about four whorls exclusive of the decollate apex. The  suture is distinct and not appressed. The whorl in front of it descends flatly to a nearly peripheral keel, the flattened portion corresponding to the anal fasciole. The fasciole is spirally sculptured by four or live very fine, equidistant, simple, similar threads, crossed by (on the body whorl about twenty-five) elevated, sharp, arcuate, lamellar riblets, which are continued over the whorl with wider interspaces to the anterior part of the base. The shoulder keel is minutely duplex, narrow, subspinose where it crosses the ribs, and more prominent than they. In front of it are about twelve strong rounded primary spiral threads, with wider interspaces, each containing a finer intercalary thread, the whole extending to the end of the siphonal canal . The aperture is narrow. The anal sulcus is wide and shallow. The outer lip is sharp and simple. The bodyof the shell is  smooth. The columella is straight, obliquely attenuated in front. The siphonal is canal narrow, straight and rather produced.

Distribution
This marine species occurs in the Gulf of Panama.

References

  Tucker, J.K. 2004 Catalog of recent and fossil turrids (Mollusca: Gastropoda). Zootaxa 682:1-1295.

serilla
Gastropods described in 1908